Leonardo Castellanos y Castellanos (November 5, 1862 in Ecuandureo, Michoacán − May 19, 1912) was a Mexican Roman Catholic bishop.

Ordained to the priesthood on March 20, 1886, Castellanos y Castellanos was named bishop of the Roman Catholic Diocese of Tabasco, Mexico in 1908 and died in 1912 while still in office.

References 

1862 births
1912 deaths
People from Michoacán
20th-century Roman Catholic bishops in Mexico
Roman Catholic bishops of Tabasco
Venerated Catholics by Pope John Paul II